Jennifer Lynn Siebel Newsom (born June 19, 1974) is an American documentary filmmaker and actress who is the current first partner of California as the wife of Governor Gavin Newsom. She is the director, writer, and producer of the film Miss Representation, which premiered in the documentary competition at the 2011 Sundance Film Festival. The film examines how the media has underrepresented women in positions of power. The Mask You Live In, her second film which she wrote, produced and directed, scrutinizes American society's definition of masculinity.

During her tenure as the wife of the governor, the role of first lady has been retitled first partner to be gender inclusive. She was previously the state's second lady from 2011 to 2019 and first lady of San Francisco from 2008 to 2011.

Early life and education
Jennifer Lynn Siebel was born in San Francisco, to Kenneth F. Siebel Jr., an investment manager, and Judy Siebel (née Fritzer), the co-founder of the Bay Area Discovery Museum in Sausalito. She grew up in the suburb of Ross, California.

Siebel Newsom is the second oldest of five girls and attended Ross Grammar School and The Branson School. When she was six, her older sister Stacy died at age eight from a golf cart accident. Siebel Newsom has stated she carries a lot of guilt as she was present at the time of the accident. During high school, she played varsity basketball, soccer, and tennis. She later graduated with honors from Stanford University, where she earned a Bachelor of Arts degree in Latin American studies in 1996 and Master of Business Administration in 2001.

At Stanford, she was recruited to play on the women's soccer team. While pursuing her MBA, Siebel Newsom also studied at the American Conservatory Theater, where she completed a certificate program. After completing her education, Siebel Newsom traveled to Africa, Latin America, and Europe on assignments with Conservation International, a global environmental coalition.

Career 

In 2002, Siebel Newsom moved to Hollywood, where she concentrated on building her acting career. Siebel Newsom earned many roles in television, film, and theater. She has appeared on such television shows as Life, Mad Men, Strong Medicine, and Numb3rs.

Miss Representation premiered at the 2011 Sundance Film Festival to mostly positive reviews. The film went on to screen at numerous other festivals, including the San Francisco International Film Festival, Athena Film Festival and won the Audience Award at the Palo Alto International Film Festival. The film interweaves stories from teenage girls with interviews with, among others, Condoleezza Rice, Lisa Ling, Nancy Pelosi, Katie Couric, Rosario Dawson, and Gloria Steinem discussing the media and its message regarding women. On February 10, 2011, Oprah Winfrey announced that she had acquired the film for the OWN Documentary Film Club.

Siebel Newsom raised $101,111 on Kickstarter to fund the production of her second film The Mask You Live In, which premiered at the 2015 Sundance Film Festival.

Siebel Newsom's third film was The Great American Lie.

Siebel Newsom directed the documentary film Fair Play in 2022.

She co-founded The Representation Project, an organization which works to end gender stereotypes. The Representation Project's board members include Jan Yanehiro, Nathan Ballard, Susie McCormick, and Maureen Pelton. In 2021, The Sacramento Bee revealed that from 2011 to 2018, Siebel Newsom earned $2.3 million from her film work through her nonprofit organization, which had received $800,000 in donations from companies with business before California's government as her husband Gavin Newsom's political career ascended, and continued to draw her salary after he became governor. While the practice is allowed by California law, outside ethics experts expressed concerns about conflicts of interest; a spokesperson for The Representation Project said Siebel Newsom had not overseen fundraising since 2015.

Personal life
In the early 2000s, Siebel Newsom dated actor George Clooney.

She met Gavin Newsom on a blind date set up by a mutual friend at the Yerba Buena Center for the Arts in October 2006. The couple announced their engagement in January 2008. Jennifer and Gavin wed in July of the same year at her parents' ranch in Stevensville, Montana. The Newsoms have four children.

In 2011, Siebel Newsom and her family moved from San Francisco to Ross, where she had grown up. In 2019, Siebel Newsom and her family moved to Fair Oaks, California.

Her sister, Melissa Siebel, is married to Joshua Irwing Schiller, son of Boies Schiller Flexner LLP co-founder Jonathan Schiller.

Siebel Newsom was registered as a Republican until 2008, before re-registering as No Party Preference. Prior to registering as an independent voter, she accidentally registered with the far-right American Independent Party, before correcting her party to "decline to state".

Siebel Newsom was one of several accusers against Harvey Weinstein in his 2022 Los Angeles criminal rape and sexual assault trial. In November 2022, Siebel Newsom testified in court that, in 2005, Weinstein had raped her in a hotel room, having lured her there under the pretenses of holding a professional discussion about film projects. Weinstein's attorney claimed what took place was "consensual, transactional sex". The jury was unable to reach a verdict on Newsom's accusation, and that of one of his other accusers, and a mistrial was declared on those charges. However, the jury found Weinstein guilty on three counts pertaining to a third accuser, an Italian model and actress. Weinstein, who was already two years into a 23-year sentence for a rape and sexual assault conviction in New York, faced a 24-year sentence for the Los Angeles verdict as of December 2022.

At the time of the Silicon Valley Bank collapse in March 2023, it was acknowledged that prominent Silicon Valley Bank executive John China sits on the board of her California Partners Project charity and also co-founded the organization's board of directors; China served as President of the Silicon Valley Bank's funds management business SVB Capital.

Filmography

Film

Television

Notes

References

External links

 Jennifer Siebel Newsom – Office of Governor Gavin Newsom
 
 

|-

1974 births
Actresses from San Francisco
American documentary filmmakers
American film actresses
American stage actresses
American television actresses
First ladies and gentlemen of San Francisco
Living people
Stanford Graduate School of Business alumni
Feminist filmmakers
People from Ross, California
Catholics from California
American women documentary filmmakers
First Ladies and Gentlemen of California
Newsom family
21st-century American women
Articles containing video clips
American feminists